The Vipava (in Slovene) or Vipacco (in Italian) or Wipbach / Wippach (in German) is a river that flows through western Slovenia and north-eastern Italy. After entering Italy it joins the Isonzo/Soča in the Municipality of Savogna d'Isonzo. This is a rare river with a delta source, formed by nine main springs. The Battle of the Frigidus was fought near the river,  which was named Frigidus ('cold') by the Romans. It has a pluvial-nival regime in its upper course and a pluvial regime in its lower course.

See also 
 List of rivers of Slovenia

References

External links
 
 Condition of Vipava at Dolenje, Dornberk, Miren - graphs, in the following order, of water level, flow and temperature data for the past 30 days (taken in Dolenje, Dornberk and Miren by ARSO)

Rivers of Italy
Rivers of the Slovene Littoral
International rivers of Europe
Rivers of the Province of Gorizia